Teragra ochreisticta is a moth in the family Cossidae. It is found in Ghana.

References
Notes

Bibliography
Natural History Museum Lepidoptera generic names catalog

Metarbelinae
Moths described in 1929